Brendan Foley is a Northern Irish writer, film producer and director.

Career
Raised in Belfast, Northern Ireland, he has written feature film and TV series scripts for producers and studios in UK, Hollywood, Canada, Denmark, Finland, Poland, South Africa and Thailand. He wrote and produced the 2005 action-thriller Johnny Was, starring Vinnie Jones, Eriq La Salle and Patrick Bergin. The film won awards including Audience Awards and Best Feature Awards from six film festivals. His most recent work includes Cold Courage, a TV series thriller for Lionsgate, Viaplay and Luminoir shot in Europe in 2019.

He wrote, produced and directed The Riddle in 2006, starring Jones, Sir Derek Jacobi and Vanessa Redgrave. In September 2007, The Riddle became the world's first feature film to be released as a DVD premiere by a national newspaper. The UK's Mail on Sunday bought UK DVD rights and distributed 2.6 million copies, making the film one of the most widely watched independent films in the UK.

During 2006-07, Foley wrote and directed Legend of the Bog, a satirical horror film set in rural Ireland, starring Jones, Jason Barry and Nora Jane Noone. It was released by Lionsgate in the US on DVD in 2009. Foley co-created and was a writer on Shelldon, a children's environmental animated TV series on NBC (2010–12) and Byrdland (five seasons of animated TV series in Asia with GMM Grammy).

In 2015, he started developing a new TV detective series for BBC TV, Farmoor (makers of The Fall) and Northern Ireland Screen (UK home of Game of Thrones) and, in 2016, he developed Tunnel Kings, a mini-series on World War II POW ‘escape-artists’ for CBC and Dream Street, Canada. Foley completed pilot scripts for SOS, a new eco-thriller series by Finnish producers Luminoir, and Kvenland, set in the Dark Ages. Previously he wrote the pilot for  drama Dr Feelgood for Monday TV (Denmark).

He has written books for US and UK publishers. Under The Wire, a World War II POW escape drama, which he wrote along with its subject, pilot William Ash, was published by  Random House, London and St Martin's Press, New York in 2005 and 2006. It became a best-seller, reaching number one on Amazon UK's history and biography charts. In 2018/19 a related TV series was developed as a future miniseries by CBC in Canada and Northern Ireland Screen.

Foley's next book, Archerfield, a novel, published in 2015, covers 16,000 years of history in one square mile of Scotland.

Cold Courage, described as a Nordic Noir series involving Finnish characters in present-day London made by Finnish producers Luminoir for Lionsgate and Viaplay, shot in London, Dublin, Belgium and Finland in 2019. Actor John Simm told Variety magazine that he was attracted to the series by the quality of the writing and the fact that it was a pan-European thriller.

Other
He is a member of the Writers Guild (GB), a Fellow of the British Association of Communicators in Business, and was made an honorary life member of the National Union of Journalists in June 2006.

External links

References

Year of birth missing (living people)
Living people
Screenwriters from Northern Ireland
Journalists from Northern Ireland
Film producers from Northern Ireland
Film directors from Northern Ireland
Male writers from Northern Ireland
Television writers from Northern Ireland
British male television writers